John Dick (June 17, 1794 – May 29, 1872) was an American politician and judge. He represented Pennsylvania as a Whig, a member of the Opposition Party and a Republican in the United States House of Representatives.

Biography

John Dick was born on June 17, 1794, in Pittsburgh, Pennsylvania. With his parents, he moved to Meadville, Pennsylvania while less than a year old, in December 1794. He attended and received his education at the common schools. He served as major of the First Battalion of the Pennsylvania Militia in 1821. Dick then served as colonel of the First Regiment in 1825 before becoming brigadier general of the Second Brigade, Sixteenth Division of the Pennsylvania Militia in 1831.  After his militia service, he moved into mercantile business and banking, establishing the banking house J.&J.R. Dick in 1850. He subsequently served as associate judge of Crawford County, Pennsylvania and was a supporter of the Atlantic and Great Western Railroad. Dick also served as a trustee of Allegheny College and president of Crawford Mutual Insurance Company.

Dick was elected to the United States House of Representatives as a Whig in 1852 for the 33rd Congress. He was reelected in 1854 as an Opposition Party candidate to the 34th Congress. In 1856, Dick was reelected as a Republican to the 35th Congress. He was renominated by the Republican Party in 1858 but withdrew his name from the election and resumed business interests.

He was married, November 16, 1830, to Jane Torbett, and had six children.  Son George was as cadet at West Point in 1850, assigned to duty in Texas in Col. Robert E. Lee’s regiment, and died in 1856.  Son J. Henry died at the age of eighteen. His son, Samuel Bernard Dick, was a Union Colonel in the Civil War.

Dick died in Meadville, Pennsylvania on May 29, 1872, and was interred in Greendale Cemetery.

References

External links

1794 births
1872 deaths
Politicians from Pittsburgh
Pennsylvania Whigs
Whig Party members of the United States House of Representatives
19th-century American politicians
Opposition Party members of the United States House of Representatives from Pennsylvania
Republican Party members of the United States House of Representatives from Pennsylvania
Burials at Greendale Cemetery